The Second Wuhan Yangtze River Bridge (Wuhan Changjiang Er Qiao) is a bridge across the Yangtze River in Wuhan, Hubei province, China. It is located northeast (downstream) of the historic central area of the city's Hankou District and is the northern crossing for the Inner Ring Road.

History
The bridge was completed in 1995 with four lanes of traffic capable of handling 50,000 vehicles per day. The bridge featured a median reserved for a branch line of the then planned Wuhan Metro Line 1. By the 2000s, due to growth in population of Wuhan, actual traffic demand using the bridge averaged 100,000 vehicles per day, peaking at 190,000 daily vehicles.  The metro line reservation was removed in 2003 when the bridge was renovated and expanded to six lanes.  With the opening of the Erqi Yangtze River Bridge downstream in 2011 typical traffic using the Second Wuhan Yangtze River Bridge was 120,000 vehicles per day.

Photo gallery

See also
 List of largest cable-stayed bridges
 Yangtze River bridges and tunnels

References 

Bridges completed in 1995
Cable-stayed bridges in China
Bridges in Wuhan
Bridges over the Yangtze River
1995 establishments in China